Damien Stephon Lewis (born March 21, 1997) is an American football guard for the Seattle Seahawks of the National Football League (NFL). He played college football at LSU. He was drafted as the 69th overall pick in the 3rd round of the 2020 NFL Draft.

Early life and high school
Lewis grew up in Biloxi, Mississippi and Atlanta before moving to Canton, Mississippi, where he attended Canton High School. Projected not to qualify academically to play Division I football, Lewis received no offers from four-year colleges coming out of high school.

College career

Lewis enrolled at Northwest Mississippi Community College after receiving a scholarship. He was named a second-team Junior College All-American in both of his seasons at Northwest Mississippi. He graduated a semester early and committed to transfer to LSU to continue his collegiate career over offers from Ole Miss, Kentucky, South Carolina, and West Virginia.

Lewis was named the Tigers starting right guard going into his first season at LSU and started all 13 of the team's games. As a senior, Lewis started all 15 of the Tigers' games and was named second-team All-Southeastern Conference as the Tigers won the 2020 National Championship.

Professional career

Lewis was selected by Seattle Seahawks in the third round with the 69th overall pick in the 2020 NFL Draft.

2020 
Lewis made his NFL debut on September 13, 2020 in the season opener against the Atlanta Falcons, starting at right guard and playing all 62 of the Seahawks' offensive snaps. Though Lewis dealt with a few minor injuries, he was able to start all 16 regular season games as well as the Seattle Seahawks' Wild Card loss to the Los Angeles Rams. He logged 967 offensive snaps, including snaps in a game in Week 11 against the Arizona Cardinals where he was the emergency center. In pass protection ratings, Lewis did well, allowing just 28 total pressures in 633 pass blocking snaps. However, he did accumulate 12 penalties, which led all NFL guards. In terms of run blocking, however, Lewis was one of the best in the league. He received an 81.5 overall run blocking score from Pro Football Focus, second only to Indianapolis Colts All-Pro and Pro Bowler Quenton Nelson. After a strong rookie year, Lewis was named to the Pro Football Writers Association's All-NFL Rookie Team.

References

External links
Seattle Seahawks bio
LSU Tigers bio

1997 births
Living people
Sportspeople from Biloxi, Mississippi
People from Canton, Mississippi
Players of American football from Mississippi
American football offensive guards
LSU Tigers football players
Northwest Mississippi Rangers football players
Seattle Seahawks players